En gnistrande jul is a 2013 Elisa's Christmas album.

Track listing
Jag drömmer om en jul hemma (White Christmas)
Låt mig få tända ett ljus (Mozart's lullaby)
I Wish It Could Be Christmas Everyday
Dagen då snön försvann
När det lider mot jul
Feliz Navidad
En ensam jul
Gnistrande kristall
Santa Lucia
Tomten ska dansa
Våran första jul
Oh helga natt (Cantique de Noël)
Christmas Is Here

Charts

References 

2013 Christmas albums
Elisa's albums
Lionheart Music Group albums
Christmas albums by Swedish artists
Swedish-language albums